This is a list of listed buildings in Fife. The list is split out by parish.

 List of listed buildings in Abdie, Fife
 List of listed buildings in Aberdour, Fife
 List of listed buildings in Anstruther Wester, Fife
 List of listed buildings in Auchterderran, Fife
 List of listed buildings in Auchtermuchty, Fife
 List of listed buildings in Auchtertool, Fife
 List of listed buildings in Ballingry, Fife
 List of listed buildings in Balmerino, Fife
 List of listed buildings in Beath, Fife
 List of listed buildings in Buckhaven And Methil, Fife
 List of listed buildings in Burntisland, Fife
 List of listed buildings in Cameron, Fife
 List of listed buildings in Carnbee, Fife
 List of listed buildings in Carnock, Fife
 List of listed buildings in Ceres, Fife
 List of listed buildings in Collessie, Fife
 List of listed buildings in Cowdenbeath, Fife
 List of listed buildings in Crail, Fife
 List of listed buildings in Creich, Fife
 List of listed buildings in Culross, Fife
 List of listed buildings in Cults, Fife
 List of listed buildings in Cupar, Fife
 List of listed buildings in Dairsie, Fife
 List of listed buildings in Dalgety, Fife
 List of listed buildings in Dunbog, Fife
 List of listed buildings in Dunfermline, Fife
 List of listed buildings in Dunino, Fife
 List of listed buildings in Elie And Earlsferry, Fife
 List of listed buildings in Elie, Fife
 List of listed buildings in Falkland, Fife
 List of listed buildings in Ferry-Port-On-Craig, Fife
 List of listed buildings in Flisk, Fife
 List of listed buildings in Forgan, Fife
 List of listed buildings in Inverkeithing, Fife
 List of listed buildings in Kemback, Fife
 List of listed buildings in Kennoway, Fife
 List of listed buildings in Kettle, Fife
 List of listed buildings in Kilconquhar, Fife
 List of listed buildings in Kilmany, Fife
 List of listed buildings in Kilrenny, Fife
 List of listed buildings in Kinghorn, Fife
 List of listed buildings in Kinglassie, Fife
 List of listed buildings in Kingsbarns, Fife
 List of listed buildings in Kirkcaldy And Dysart, Fife
 List of listed buildings in Kirkcaldy, Fife
 List of listed buildings in Ladybank, Fife
 List of listed buildings in Largo, Fife
 List of listed buildings in Leslie, Fife
 List of listed buildings in Leuchars, Fife
 List of listed buildings in Leven, Fife
 List of listed buildings in Lochgelly, Fife
 List of listed buildings in Logie, Fife
 List of listed buildings in Markinch, Fife
 List of listed buildings in Monimail, Fife
 List of listed buildings in Moonzie, Fife
 List of listed buildings in Newburgh, Fife
 List of listed buildings in Newburn, Fife
 List of listed buildings in Newport-On-Tay, Fife
 List of listed buildings in Pittenweem, Fife
 List of listed buildings in Saline, Fife
 List of listed buildings in Scoonie, Fife
 List of listed buildings in St Andrews And St Leonards, Fife
 List of listed buildings in St Andrews, Fife
 List of listed buildings in St Monance, Fife
 List of listed buildings in Strathmiglo, Fife
 List of listed buildings in Tayport, Fife
 List of listed buildings in Torryburn, Fife
 List of listed buildings in Tulliallan, Fife
 List of listed buildings in Wemyss, Fife

Fife